HD 220689 is a single star in the equatorial constellation of Aquarius. It is a challenge to view with the naked eye, having an apparent visual magnitude of +7.74, but is readily viewed with a pair of binoculars. The star is located at a distance of 153 light years from the Sun based on parallax, and is drifting further away with a radial velocity of +12 km/s. A survey in 2015 has ruled out the existence of any additional stellar companions at projected distances from 26 to 305 astronomical units.

The stellar classification of HD 220689 is G3V, matching a yellow hued G-type main-sequence star that is generating energy through core hydrogen fusion. It is roughly 4.6 billion years old and is spinning with a projected rotational velocity of 5.5 km/s, giving it a rotation period of around 29 days. The star has a similar size, mass, and elemental abundances as the Sun. It is radiating 1.5 times the luminosity of the Sun from its photosphere at an effective temperature of 5,921 K.

Planetary system
From 1998 to 2012, the star was under observation from the CORALIE echelle spectrograph at La Silla Observatory. In 2012, a long-period, wide-orbiting exoplanet was deduced from radial velocity variations. This was published in November.

References

External links
 

G-type main-sequence stars
Planetary systems with one confirmed planet
Aquarius (constellation)
Durchmusterung objects
220689
115662